Child of the Light is a novel by Janet Berliner and George Guthridge published by White Wolf in 1991.

Plot summary
Child of the Light is set in between World War I and World War II, and involves the story of the love between three children: Sol a Jewish boy who suffers visions of a horrific future; Erich, his arrogant friend who can communicate with dogs; and Miriam, the talented niece of a prominent Jew.

Reception
Gideon Kibblewhite reviewed Child of the Light for Arcane magazine, rating it a 4 out of 10 overall. Kibblewhite comments that "It's a wonder that Sol and Miriam love [Erich] at all. But that's the book's major theme, really: love knows no bounds. Its great strength is the way it uses an unusual story to explore a period of history that has already received much literary attention."

Kirkus Reviews states "Beautifully done, with a dour Jewish humor, but the raison d`etre is a bit obscure. Perhaps the second novel, featuring a battle between Jews and Nazis, will clear things up."

Reviews
Review by Gary K. Wolfe (1992) in Locus, #375 April 1992 
Review by Orson Scott Card (1993) in The Magazine of Fantasy & Science Fiction, January 1993 
Review by Paul Di Filippo (1996) in Asimov's Science Fiction, October-November 1996

References

1991 novels
American horror novels